Okpho Township or Okpo Township is a township in Tharrawaddy District in the Bago Region of Burma. The principal town is Okpho.

On 25 March 2013, Muslim house and mosques were attacked by Buddhist mobs in the township following similar violence in other parts of Burma.

References

 
Townships of the Bago Region
Tharrawaddy District